Atlanta Black Pride started in 1996 and is one of two officially recognized festivals for the African-American LGBT community.  It is held in Atlanta each year at the end of August and beginning of September (week of Labor Day holiday). Atlanta Black Pride is the largest black gay pride celebration in the world with an estimated 100,000 people annually in attendance. Atlanta Black Pride heavily contributes to the annual $65 million economic impact on Atlanta's economy during the city's eventful Labor Day weekend most recently organized by Traxx Girls Inc & Atlanta Black Pride Weekend LLC due to the administration dissolve of In The Life Atlanta.

Atlanta is widely noted for being the "Black Gay Mecca" due to its highly visible black LGBT community, progressive reputation, and vibrant black LGBT culture. It also is noted for having one of the largest communities of openly black same-sex couples in the world.

ATL Winter Pride
January's Martin Luther King Jr. holiday weekend is when Atlanta's first major pride event of the year is held.  During this unofficial pride weekend, there are several special black LGBT events and celebrations to entertain the many locals and visitors.

King's wife and Atlanta resident, Coretta Scott King, was a well-known proud supporter of the black LGBT community. In 1998, Mrs. King publicly stated at the 25th Lambda Legal anniversary reception that she believes her late husband would have also been a supporter of LGBT rights.

See also
African Americans in Atlanta
Atlanta Gay Center
Atlanta Pride
Ansley Mall
Atlanta Gay Men's Chorus
Cheshire Bridge Road
Georgia Equality
African-American LGBT community
Black gay pride

References

External links

African-American festivals
African-American history in Atlanta
Festivals in Atlanta
LGBT African-American culture
LGBT culture in Atlanta
Pride parades in Georgia (U.S. state)